Alaior (previously in Spanish, Alayor) is a municipality on the island of Menorca, in the Balearic Islands, Spain. It is situated 12 km from the capital, Maó. In 2005 it had a population of 8,671 and it covers an area of 109.77 km².

The principal activities are tourism, shoemaking, cheese, and construction materials.

The patron saint of the municipality is Saint Lawrence and Saint Eulalia. For this reason, the patron festivals are celebrated the weekend after August 10, the saint's festival day, with jaleo dance.

The principal tourist centers are Son Bou, Sant Jaume, Torre Solí, Cala'n Porter, and Cales Coves.

References

External links
Town Guide

Town council webpage
Alaior Town Guide 
 Guide to Menorca: Alaior
 Alaior, nearby beaches, prehistoric monuments and villages

Municipalities in Menorca
Populated places in Menorca